Vida Vencienė (maiden name Vida Mogenytė; born 28 May 1961 in Ukmergė) is a former cross-country skier who represented the Soviet Union and later Lithuania from 1988 to 1994. She won a gold medal over 10 km and a bronze over 5 km at the 1988 Winter Olympics in Calgary for the Soviet Union.

Her best finish at the FIS Nordic World Ski Championships was seventh in the 30 km event in 1989. She also finished second in a 10 km event in a World Cup event in Leningrad in 1988.

Cross-country skiing results
All results are sourced from the International Ski Federation (FIS).

Olympic Games
 2 medals – (1 gold, 1 bronze)

World Championships

World Cup

Season standings

Individual podiums
1 victory 
3 podiums 

Note:   Until  the 1994 Olympics, Olympic races were included in the World Cup scoring system.

References

External links

1961 births
Living people
Lithuanian female cross-country skiers
Soviet female cross-country skiers
Olympic cross-country skiers of Lithuania
Olympic cross-country skiers of the Soviet Union
Olympic gold medalists for the Soviet Union
Olympic bronze medalists for the Soviet Union
Cross-country skiers at the 1988 Winter Olympics
Cross-country skiers at the 1992 Winter Olympics
Cross-country skiers at the 1994 Winter Olympics
Olympic medalists in cross-country skiing
Venciene
Medalists at the 1988 Winter Olympics